Papaver lateritium, the Armenian poppy, is a species of poppy endemic to Armenian Highlands, Georgia and North Eastern Turkey (Black Sea mountains).

Description

Mostly basal leaves, lanceolate, coarsely- toothed to pinnately-lobed, leaves and stems hairy; solitary flowers, bright brick red, sometimes apricot, 4.5–6 cm across, orange-yellow anthers; sepals covered in long yellowish hairs; fruit capsule club-shaped, broadest below stigmatic disk; stoloniferous perennial; up to 50 cm; stems unbranched.

References

lateritium
Garden plants
Endemic flora of Turkey